The 2012 Southwestern Athletic Conference baseball tournament took place at Lee–Hines Field, on the campus of Southern University in Baton Rouge, LA from May 16 through 20, 2012.  The  won their third tournament championship and earned the conference's automatic bid to the 2012 NCAA Division I baseball tournament.

The double elimination tournament featured the top four teams from each division, leaving one team from each division out of the field.

Seeding
The top four finishers in each division were seeded one through four, with the top seed from each division facing the fourth seed from the opposite division in the first round, and so on.  Alcorn State claimed the second seed from the East by tiebreaker over Alabama State.  The teams played a two bracket, double-elimination tournament with a one-game final between the winners of each bracket.

Bracket

All-Tournament Team
The following players were named to the All-Tournament Team.

Most Valuable Player
Evan Richard was named Most Valuable Player.  Richard was a catcher for Prairie View A&M.

References

Tournament
Southwestern Athletic Conference Baseball Tournament
Southwestern Athletic Conference baseball tournament
Southwestern Athletic Conference baseball tournament